Church of Truth refers to a community of ministries in the United States, founded in 1913.

History
Dr. Albert C. Grier founded his first Church of the Truth in 1913 in Spokane, Washington. This was the first of 22 Churches of Truth founded by him in the early 20th century. His aim was to create a place which would heal the total human: mind, body and soul, thus creating a full awakening of the Christ within.

The Church of Truth is part of the loosely formed New Thought movement. The Church of Truth has a vision: "We are an inclusive community of Christ-centered, prosperous, healing ministries, which through affirmative prayer and support, empower all people to awaken the Christ within."

Dr. Albert Grier
Born on February 27, 1864, Dr. Albert Grier, studied at University of Michigan where he graduated with a Degree in Science in 1886. He then studied for the ministry in 1890 and became a Minister in the Universalist Church in Spokane, Washington. He became a prominent leader in the New Thought Movement, where he worked with other leaders such as Ernest Holmes.  He was a fantastic "teacher" of mental, physical, and spiritual healing using the Universal Principles.  He was lecturing as well as writing books which he did extensively throughout the United States.

External links 
 https://web.archive.org/web/20071225010508/http://www.silentmiracles.net/
 https://web.archive.org/web/20110706172323/http://www.churchesoftruth-alliance.ca/

References 
Melton, J. Gordon, ed. The Encyclopedia of American Religions:Religious Creeds. Detroit:Gale Research Company, 1988. .

New Thought churches
Religion in Washington (state)
1913 establishments in Washington (state)
Christian organizations established in 1913
University of Michigan alumni